If Love Were All, subtitled "a gentle comedy," is a comedy in two acts and 10 scenes by Agnes Morgan under the pseudonym "Cutler Hatch." It was first produced at the Booth Theatre on Broadway by Actor-Managers, Inc. (the firm set up by Morgan and her partner Helen Arthur).  Settings were created by Charles Stepanek. It is notable for being a play staged on Broadway written by a woman, and produced by women.

If Love Were All ran from November 13 through November 21, 1931. It was subsequently produced by Helen Arthur (Agnes Morgan's partner) in summer 1936 at the Casino Theatre in Newport, Rhode Island.

Plot
Margaret Bryce has been happily married to Dr. Philip Bryce for many years. Dr. Bryce is a tolerant man but very devoted to his work and his patients. Even though in love with Margaret, he doesn't give enough attention to her. Janet Bryce, their child, is 18, admires her mother and is deeply devoted to her father.

During Easter vacation, Janet is home from college and discovers her mother has been seeing another man: Frank Grayson, a wealthy businessman with a wife and 19-year old son, Roland. Determined to prevent Dr. Bryce from finding out, Janet meets with Roland at the end of the school year in June and convinces him of the affair. Roland reveals that his mother is an invalid, and that knowledge of her husband's extra-marital affair would kill her. The two college-age children recognize that their generation has the understanding of how love can happen and the ability to accept it with tolerance. Janet is particularly sensitive, having just come out of a relationship. They also believe their parents' generation lacks the ability to understand and deal with such things. Seeing no way to break up their respective parents' affair, they decide to let them spend the summer with each other by vacationing with the unsuspecting spouses for three months.

On the French Riviera, Janet is with her father when she encounters George Manning, the person with whom she had an unsuccessful relationship.  He is now married and unhappy. Even though Janet believes she could win him back, she recognizes the unhappiness that would befall his wife.

Meanwhile in the mountains of Vermont, Margaret Bryce and Frank Grayson have been having an enjoyable vacation.  After discussing divorce from their respective spouses, they agree not to do it, recognizing the unhappiness it would bring along with the disruption of their families.

In October the families are reunited. Janet and Roland have grown fond of one another but realize their plan was a failure. Margaret Bryce and Frank Grayson seem just as much in love as ever.  Janet and Roland agree to invite Margaret and Frank and themselves to dinner at a restaurant to have things out and come to a resolution.

At a German restaurant on the Upper East Side of Manhattan, Janet and Roland reveal to Margaret and Frank that they know all about their extra-marital affair and plea on behalf of the absent parents. But Margaret and Frank reveal a surprise as well:  Both of their spouses have known of the extra-marital affair from the start.  Because of their acceptance, there had never been any deception. Janet and Roland, shamefaced, realize that their generation does not have a monopoly on understanding human relationships.  The curtain falls as they drink a toast to the absent parents, recognizing the understanding that they have yet to develop.

Roles and original Broadway cast
Aline MacMahon as Margaret Bryce
Walter Kingsford as Dr. Philip Bryce, her husband
Margaret Sullavan as Janet Bryce, their daughter
Hugh Buckler as Frank Grayson
Mabel Moore as Alice Grayson, his wife
Donald Blackwell as Ronald Grayson, their son
Mark Loebell as George Manning
John M. Troughton as John
Jules Bennett as Emil, the head waiter
Emil Hurst as Fritz, a German waiter
Lewis McMichael as Henri, a French waiter
George Plinge as an English tourist
A middle-aged German lad
Virginia Cole as a young French lady
Joseph E. Henshaw as Herr Schwartz, a middle-aged German man
Josephin Wehn as Frau Schwartz, his middle-aged wife
Walter Spelvin as a youngish Frenchman

Reception
Reviews of the original Broadway production found If Love Were All lacking in a clear dramatic arc. Writing in the New York Times, Brooks Atkinson found that the play's solution was too clearly worked out and that it lacked a sufficient build up. "The situation is farce; the theme appears to be tragic; the characters are cut out of pasteboard; the ideas come out of books. The result is a play accurately described by the lady in the row behind as cute."  He concluded that the plot "never comes to life as a play or a tangible problem. At best it contrives to be cute."

Eugene Burr, writing in Billboard,  came away with a different reaction, calling it "a thoroly [sic] delightful play." He felt the play was conveying the contrast between passionate love which tends to be brief and affectionate love that comes with marriage, and that the two can co-exist. Burr singled out Aline MacMahon's acting, "a lovely, lilting performance that caught up the audience completely in its glamorous net." Burr remarked on Margaret Sullavan's return to the Broadway stage after a stint in Hollywood, but found her southern accent annoying and her general manner too cute.

The unnamed reviewer in Variety found If Love Were All to be too mild and overlong. Observing the play is based on a generational divide, the review complained the play lacked a strong "punch" moment, suggesting correlation with the play's subtitle "a gentle comedy." Of the actors, Sullavan was the only one who was subjected to criticism, the reviewer describing her performance as needing "some toning down, being a bit flouncy and jumpy."

References

External links

If Love Were All - typescript (Aline MacMahon's copy) in the Billy Rose Theatre Division of the New York Public Library for the Performing Arts

1931 plays
Broadway plays
Plays set in the 20th century
Plays set in New York (state)